Girija Joshi is an Indian actress who appears in Marathi movies. She made her debut with Govinda in 2013 opposite Swapnil Joshi.

Personal life 
Girija was born in Raigad district, Maharashtra. She completed her primary education in K.E.S English Medium School, Roha, Raigad then she moved to Vashi, Navi Mumbai. She has a completed an acting course through St. Joseph's Academy, Dehradun. In 2015, She is married to Chinmay Udgirkar.

Career 
Girija started her career in Marathi film Govinda opposite Swapnil Joshi. She will be the co-star of Siddharth Jadhav in Powder movie and Priyatama . In 2014 she appeared in 'Dhamak' opposite Aniket Vishwasrao.

Filmography

References

External links

Living people
Indian film actresses
Actresses in Marathi cinema
People from Raigad district
Year of birth missing (living people)